Himid is a surname. Notable people with the surname include: 

Hamid Himid (born  1955), Eritrean politician
Lubaina Himid (born 1954), British artist and curator